Kentucky's 9th congressional district was a district of the United States House of Representatives in Kentucky. It was lost to redistricting in 1953. Its last Representative was James S. Golden.

List of members representing the district

References

 Congressional Biographical Directory of the United States 1774–present

09
Former congressional districts of the United States
1813 establishments in Kentucky
Constituencies established in 1813
Constituencies disestablished in 1933
1933 disestablishments in Kentucky
Constituencies established in 1935
1935 establishments in Kentucky
Constituencies disestablished in 1953
1953 disestablishments in Kentucky